Maria Adriana Willeboordse (December 25, 1902 – August 18, 1989) was a Dutch artist.

Biography 
Willeboordsel was born on 25 December 1902 in Rotterdam. She attended the Academie voor Beeldende Kunsten (Academy of Visual Arts) in Rotterdam. Her work was included in the 1939 exhibition and sale Onze Kunst van Heden (Our Art of Today) at the Rijksmuseum in Amsterdam.  She was a member of the Nederlandse Kunstkring (Dutch Art Circle) in The Hague and the Kunstenaarssociëteit (Artist Society) in Rotterdam.

Willeboordsel died on 18 August 1989 in Leidschendam.

References

1902 births
1989 deaths
Artists from Rotterdam
20th-century Dutch women artists